Luciana Andrade is the debut extended play by Brazilian singer Luciana Andrade. The EP was released on November 21, 2010, on their official website.

Track listing

References

Luciana Andrade albums
2010 EPs